Cromartyshire was a county constituency of the House of Commons of Great Britain from 1708 until 1800, and of the House of Commons of the United Kingdom from 1801 to 1832.

The constituency
The British parliamentary constituency of Cromartyshire was created in 1708 following the Acts of Union, 1707 and replaced the former Parliament of Scotland shire constituency of Cromartyshire. Cromartyshire was paired as an alternating constituency with neighbouring Nairnshire. The freeholders of Cromartyshire elected one Member of Parliament (MP)  to one Parliament, while those of Nairnshire elected a Member to the next.

Abolition
The Representation of the People (Scotland) Act 1832 abolished the alternating constituencies. Cromartyshire was merged with Ross-shire to form the single constituency of Ross and Cromarty, both counties electing one Member between them to each Parliament.

Members of Parliament

References

Historic parliamentary constituencies in Scotland (Westminster)
Constituencies of the Parliament of the United Kingdom established in 1708
Constituencies of the Parliament of the United Kingdom disestablished in 1832